Paramorbia aureocastanea is a species of moth of the family Tortricidae. It is found in Ecuador (Morona-Santiago Province and Carchi Province).

Description
The ground colour of the forewings is golden yellow suffused, strigulated and reticulated with rust or orange rust. The markings are rust. The hindwings are brownish, tinged with ochreous. It head and thorax are dark yellow in colour.

Etymology
The species name refers to the yellow and brown colour pattern of the forewings and is derived from Latin aureus (meaning golden) and castaneus (meaning chestnut).

References

External links

Moths described in 2006
Endemic fauna of Ecuador
Sparganothini
Moths of South America
Taxa named by Józef Razowski